Sonerila bolavenensis is a species of flowering plant in the genus Sonerila first described in May 2021. It is found in the Bolaven Plateau in Laos. It is small and has a height of 1.2–3 cm.

It is similar to Sonerila vatphouensis and Sonerila tuberosa.

References 

Melastomataceae